There & Back is the fourth studio solo album by guitarist Jeff Beck, released in June 1980 through Epic Records. The album reached No. 10 and 21 on the U.S. Billboard Jazz Albums and Billboard 200 charts respectively, and No. 36 on the Swedish albums chart.

The album showcases Beck's stylistic shift towards instrumental rock whilst largely retaining the jazz fusion elements of his two previous releases, Blow by Blow (1975) and Wired (1976). "Star Cycle" was used for a number of years as the theme song for both Mid-South Wrestling in the United States and the British music programme The Tube; "The Pump" was featured in the 1983 film Risky Business; "Too Much to Lose" is an instrumental cover of a song composed by keyboardist Jan Hammer that was originally featured on the Jan Hammer Group's 1977 album Melodies.

Track listing

Personnel
Jeff Beck – guitar, producer
Jan Hammer – keyboard (tracks 1–3), drums (track 1)
Tony Hymas – keyboard (tracks 4–8)
Simon Phillips – drums (tracks 2–7)
Mo Foster – bass (tracks 4–7)

Technical
Ken Scott – producer

Charts

References

External links
Jeff Beck - There & Back (1980) at Prog Archives

Jeff Beck albums
1980 albums
Epic Records albums
Albums produced by Ken Scott